An , is a story-based video game that is targeted towards women. Generally one of the goals, besides the main idea/goal, is to develop a romantic relationship between the female player/main character and one of the second-lead male characters.

History
The first otome game is generally acknowledged to be Angelique, released in 1994 by Koei in Japan for the Super Famicom, and created by an all-woman team. The game was originally designed for pre-teen and younger teenage girls, but became unexpectedly popular with older teenagers and women in their 20s. In 2021, the series continues with Angelique Luminarise, in which the protagonist is a 25-year-old office worker. Angelique is credited with "set[ting] up the specifics and conventions of women's games: a focus on romance, easy controls and utilizing other multimedia." After Angelique came in 1997 the second otome game, Albaria no Otome which was created by Gimmick House and Magical Craft for PC-FX and later for PlayStation. The game has a very similar dynamic to its predecessor Angelique, with the protagonist Ashanty, a young woman who will have to choose between being the new sacred protector of a kingdom, or falling in love and living happily with one of her knights who will help her during the game. In 2002, Konami released its very successful Tokimeki Memorial Girl's Side, which brought many new fans to the still-new genre. In 2006, Famitsu's listings for the Top 20 selling love games included seven otome games. Early games borrowed heavily from the iconography and story conventions of "retro shoujo manga", "the archetypical girly heroines, the emphasis on pure, sexless, tranquil romance and on a peaceful, stable setting", but as the category expanded, other narrative and gameplay elements were introduced, including action, adventure, combat and plots in which "the heroine can 'save the world' and 'get the guy' at the same time".

McKenzie & Co (1995) from American Laser Games and Girl's Club (1992) from Philips Interactive were simulation games for girls developed and released in the US in the past. The first Japanese otome game to be officially translated and sold in English was the visual novel Yo-Jin-Bo in 2006 for the PC. Since then there have been a small handful of releases increasing each year, including Hakuoki: Demon of the Fleeting Blossom for the PSP and 3DS.

Some publications that regularly cover otome games include B's LOG and Dengeki Girl's Style.

Style
The genre has many style elements in common with shōjo manga and josei manga, and plotwise they are often similar to harem manga. There are also games targeted towards women that are focused on romance between men, called , and sometimes there are yaoi (boys' love) elements in otome games, but the two genres are usually kept separate.

Otome games that are released on console and handheld platforms contain no pornographic content, as companies such as Sony and Nintendo do not allow it. There are games released on a PC platform which are rated 18+ for their sexual content. Some games were originally released for the PC with pornographic content, and were later toned down and re-released for the PS2.

Other common elements in otome games are the importance of voice acting, CG stills, and a small epilogue or set scene at the end of the game when a character is successfully finished.

Gameplay
Traditionally, the goal of these games is to have the desired partner fall in love and have a relationship with the player character, but the requirements for gaining a "good end" differ from game to game. While the plots of otome games differ greatly, there is usually a single female main character, and several good-looking males of varying "types".

Gameplay occasionally does not particularly focus on romance, even if there are several characters whose "routes" can be followed.

In the visual novel examples of the genre, the player proceeds in the story by selecting dialogue or action choices which affect their relationships in a decision tree format. In simulation otome games, there is also other gameplay which affects the plot, either by playing minigames or by raising stats. The main character often has several parameters, such as looks, style, intelligence, talent, etc., that can be raised through various activities in normal gameplay. The potential partners usually require a certain parameter or parameters to be at a certain level for them to fall in love with the main character. There is also often a pure dating aspect of gameplay in simulations. This involves asking or being asked on dates by the love interest, doing an activity with them, and responding to their questions or comments. The player has a choice of responses, and a correct answer will raise your standing with that character.

The love interests are often voiced by well-known voice actors. At certain points, or when the player passes certain requirements, special events can occur, often with a "CG" (computer graphic) as a reward. This CG is a set picture featuring the love interest and sometimes the main character in a pose, and some dialogue.

Most otome games' heroines are not voiced, due to the budget concerns of voicing all their dialogue. However, there are some games featuring fully voiced heroines, such as Norn9 or Haruka: Beyond the Stream of Time.

Other media adaptation

Manga
Otome games have strong links with shōjo manga, with popular titles often spawning a manga series (e.g. Neo Angelique and Meine Liebe), and popular manga series getting adapted to videogames (such as Nana).  Some examples of simultaneous releases of a manga and otome game also exist, such as Angelique and Full House Kiss. It's also common to find dōjinshi featuring popular characters from otome games.

Anime
Some popular games have also been adapted to anime, OVAs, or series, such as Angelique, Diabolik Lovers and Uta no Prince-sama.

Notable otome games

Notable otome game developers and publishers

See also
 Otomechikku, a genre of manga

References

External links

 B's Log: monthly Japanese-language magazine focusing on female-targeted games (mostly otome and BL)
 Dengeki Girl's Style: Japanese language magazine about female-targeted games released in even months (mostly otome and BL)

 
Romance video games
Video game genres